Endre Lépold (21 October 1955 – 18 June 2020) was a Hungarian sprinter.

He competed without reaching the final in the 60 metres at the 1974 European Indoor Championships,  the 100 metres and the 4 × 100 metres relay at the 1974 European Championships, and the 100 metres and 200 metres at the 1976 Summer Olympics.

He died on 18 June 2020.

References

External links
 

1955 births
2020 deaths
Athletes (track and field) at the 1976 Summer Olympics
Hungarian male sprinters
Olympic athletes of Hungary